The 2002 California State Controller election was on November 5, 2002. The primary elections took place on March 5, 2002. Businessman Steve Westly, the Democratic nominee, narrowly defeated the Republican nominee, Senator Tom McClintock, for the office previously held by Kathleen Connell, who was term-limited.

Primary results
A bar graph of statewide results in this contest are available at https://web.archive.org/web/20080905210455/http://primary2002.ss.ca.gov/Returns/ctl/00.htm.

Results by county are available here and here.

Democratic

Candidates 
Steve Westly, Venture Capitalist

Johan Klehs, Member of The State Board of Equalization

Republican

Candidates 
Tom McClintock, State Senator, nominee for CA-24 in 1992 and nominee for Controller in 1994

Dean Andal, Former Assemblyman

W. Snow Hume

Nancy Beecham

Green

Others

Results

Results by county
Results from the Secretary of State of California:

See also
California state elections, 2002
State of California
California State Controller

References

External links
VoteCircle.com Non-partisan resources & vote sharing network for Californians
Information on the elections from California's Secretary of State 
Official Homepage of the California State Controller

2002 California elections 
California State Controller elections
November 2002 events in the United States
California